This is a list of the most populous urban areas in the United Kingdom based on the 2011 census, as defined by the Office for National Statistics (ONS).

Definition
The methodology used by ONS in 2011 is set out in 2011 Built-up Areas – Methodology and Guidance, published in June 2013. When ONS reported the results of the 2011 UK census, it used the term "built-up area" rather than the term "urban area" as used in previous censuses. ONS states, however, that the criteria used to define "built-up area" have not changed:

In reporting the 2001 census, the ONS gave a clearer definition of the term "built-up" as follows:

Most populous
The list below shows the most populated urban areas in the United Kingdom as defined by the Office for National Statistics (ONS), but as readily referenced at Citypopulation.de. The list includes all urban areas with a population in excess of 100,000 at the 2011 census.

Map

See also
City region (United Kingdom)

Notes

References

External links
 2011 census – built-up areas Nomis
 Mid 2012 Population estimates for Scotland
 The population of Northern Ireland – at NISRA

Conurbations
United Kingdom
Office for National Statistics
Conurbation
United Kingdom
Conurbations